Microsomal glutathione S-transferase 2 is an enzyme that in humans is encoded by the MGST2 gene.

The MAPEG (Membrane-Associated Proteins in Eicosanoid and Glutathione metabolism) family consists of six human proteins, several of which are involved in the production of leukotrienes and prostaglandin E, important mediators of inflammation. This gene encodes a protein that catalyzes the conjugation of leukotriene A4 and reduced glutathione to produce leukotriene C4.

References

Further reading